The DB Insurance Promy Open is a professional golf tournament that takes place in South Korea sponsored by DB Insurance. Until 2017 it was called the Dongbu Insurance Promy Open. It has been held at Montvert Country Club from 2015 to 2019. Since 2014 it has been the opening event of the season, held in April. In 2010 and 2011 the event had prize money of ₩300,000,000, rising to ₩400,000,000 in 2012 and ₩500,000,000 in 2016. The event was cancelled in 2020 but returned in 2021 with prize money of ₩700,000,000 and a new venue, Oak Valley Country Club.

In 2008 and 2009 Dongbu Insurance sponsored a match play event, the SBS Dongbu Insurance Matchplay Championship, the forerunner of the Munsingwear Championship which started in 2010. Prize money was ₩300,000,000 in both years. In 2006 and 2007 they sponsored a 36-hole end-of-season invitational event which included seniors. They also sponsored the KPGA Championship in 2005.

Winners

Source:

References

Korean Tour events
Golf tournaments in South Korea
Recurring sporting events established in 2010
2010 establishments in South Korea